Zoran Simjanović (11 May 1946 – 11 April 2021) was a Serbian and Yugoslav musician, composer and music educator.

Simjanović started his career in 1961, as the keyboardist for the rock band Siluete. In 1962, he moved to the band Elipse, with which he achieved nationwide popularity. After Elipse disbanded in 1968, Simjanović graduated at the Belgrade Music Academy and dedicated himself to composing. He wrote songs for popular Yugoslav singers, and, since 1973, started composing scores for cinema, television and theatre in Yugoslavia and abroad, spawning many different genres. He wrote music for 65 feature films, winning numerous awards for his scores. He was a professor at the Faculty of Applied Arts in Belgrade, the Faculty of Music Arts in Belgrade and the University of Montenegro Music Academy in Cetinje. He was a member of the European Film Academy, International Animated Film Association and the French Society of Authors, Composers and Music Editors.

Biography

Early life
Zoran Simjanović was born in Belgrade. At the age of six he began playing the piano, and later he attended the Mokranjac Music School.

Career as a rock musician (1961-1968)
In 1961, Simjanović was among the forming members of the beat band Siluete, in which he played the keyboards. In 1963, he moved to the band Elipse. With Elipse Simjanović achieved nationwide popularity, with the band's live performances and releases being praised by the press. Yugoslav media promoted rivalry between Elipse and Siluete, comparing it to the one between The Rolling Stones and The Beatles. Elipse initially performed beat and rhythm and blues, and in 1968, with the arrival of African vocalist Edi Dekeng, added a brass section and moved towards soul music. During their six-year career Elipse held hundreds of concerts and performed as an opening band on The Searchers and The Hollies concerts in Yugoslavia.

In 1967, Elipse appeared in the movies The Naughty Ones, directed by Kokan Rakonjac, and The Rats Woke Up, directed by Živojin Pavlović. The Naughty Ones were the first Yugoslav and Balkan film to feature a performance of a rock band. The music for the film was written by composer Zoran Hristić. As he lacked experience in composing popular music, he cooperated with Simjanović on the film score. After this cooperation, Hristić persuaded Simjanović to quit his studies of law and to study music.

With Elipse Simjanović released three EPs. The band disbanded in 1968, when the band members decided to dedicate themselves to their studies. The Elipse material released on the EPs, along with the unreleased material, appeared on the compilation album Elipse za prijatelje (1963-1968) (Elipse for Friends), released by Simjanović through his own independent record label Simke Music in 1999.

Career as a popular music composer (1968-1979)
After Elipse disbanded, Simjanović composed music for various popular music artists, including Seka Kojadinović, Dušan Prelević, Zdravo and Zafir Hadžimanov and Senka Veletanlić. In 1976, Simjanović wrote music for songs "Dalje, dalje" ("Further, Further") and "Gde je kraj snovima mojim" ("Where Do My Dreams End") on the lyrics of writers Milovan Vitezović and Ljubivoje Ršumović respectively; the songs were recorded by the long jumper Nenad Stekić. He also wrote arrangements for songs recorded by Olivera Katarina, Zafir Hadžimanov, Vlastimir Đuza Stojiljković and Senka Veletanlić. At the end of 1970s he stopped composing songs for popular music acts and dedicated himself to film, theatre and television music. He made exceptions occasionally only, most notably in 1985, when he composed the song "Čarobnjaci" ("Wizards") on the lyrics of writer Milan Oklopdžić for the synthpop/pop rock band Laki Pingvini.

Career as a film, theatre and television composer (1973-2021)
After he graduated at the Belgrade Music Academy, Simjanović turned towards music for film, theatre and television. He debuted in this field in 1973, with music for children's television series Slike bez rama – iz dečijih knjiga (Frameless Pictures – From Children's Books). Another significant contribution as a composer in the field of television was the theme for the newscast Dnevnik in 1979, recorded with the participation of members from Korni Grupa. In 1975, he wrote music for Srđan Karanović's TV series The Unpicked Strawberries, and in 1977 he wrote music for his first feature film, Goran Marković's Special Education. His cooperation with Karanović and Marković would continue during the following decades. The most notable films for which he wrote music were Special Education (1977), Fragrance of Wild Flowers (1977), National Class Category Up to 785 ccm (1979), Petria's Wreath (1980), All That Jack's (1980), Do You Remember Dolly Bell? (1981), The Marathon Family (1982), Variola Vera (1982), Something in Between (1983), Balkan Express (1983), Taiwan Canasta (1985), Hard to Swallow (1985), When Father Was Away on Business (1985), Hey Babu Riba (1986), The Beauty of Vice (1986), Reflections (1987), Guardian Angel (1987), A Film with No Name (1988), Cognac (1988), Balkan Express 2 (1988), Time of Miracles (1989), The Meeting Point (1989), Virgina (1991), Tango Argentino (1992), Tito and Me (1992), Say Why Have You Left Me (1993), The Tragic Burlesque (1995), Cabaret Balkan (1998), Serbia, Year Zero (2001), Loving Glances (2003), Midwinter Night's Dream (2004), The Tour (2008), Solemn Promise (2009), Falsifier (2013). Until his death in 2021, he has written music scores for 65 feature films. At the Pula Film Festival he was awarded the Golden Arena for Best Film Music twice, for The Fragrance of Wild Flowers in 1978 and for Balkan Express in 1983. In 1983, he shared the Special Award of the City of Valencia with Yves Montand. For that occasion he wrote music for the opening of that year's Festival in Valencia. Simjanović also wrote music for over 40 short films and for over 30 short animated films.

Music composed for the films Special Education, Fragrance of Wild Flowers, National Class Category Up to 785 ccm, Sok od šljiva, Balkan Express, When Father Was Away on Business, Hard to Swallow, Guardian Angel, Balkan Express 2 and Cabaret Balkan were released on soundtrack albums. Some of the songs written by Simjanović for films became nationwide hits, most notably the songs "Floyd", performed by Dado Topić, and "Zašto" ("Why"), performed by Oliver Dragojević, both originally appearing in the film National Class Category Up to 785 ccm. For the recording of the soundtrack album for this film, a supergroup Mag (Wizard) was formed, consisting of former Korni Grupa member Josip Boček (guitar), former Elipse and Korni Grupa members Bojan Hreljac (bass guitar) and Vladimir "Furda" Furduj (drums), composer and former San member Sanja Ilić (keyboards) and composer and musician Sloba Marković (keyboards). Mag played the songs composed by Zoran Simjanović, with lyrics written by lyricist Marina Tucaković, and the vocals were recorded by popular Yugoslav singers Dado Topić, Oliver Dragojević, Slađana Milošević, Oliver Mandić, Zumreta Midžić "Zuzi" and the members of the band Laboratorija Zvuka. Simjanović cooperated with numerous prominent musicians on his music scores, including Zlatko Manojlović, Bora Dugić, David D'Or, Šaban Bajramović, and others.

During his career, Simjanović composed scores for over 20 theatre plays in various Belgrade theatres, as well as for the musicals Beogradosti (the title being a word play which could be translated as Joys of Belgrade), Ribe u moru (The Fish in the Sea), Male tajne (Little Secrets) and several cabarets. Simjanovć wrote music for Beogradosti on the lyrics of writer Milovan Vitezović. It was released in 1980 on the album of the same title. With Italian director Paolo Magelli he worked on the Paris version of Machiavelli's The Mandrake, and after its success he cooperated with Magelli again, on the play The Straitjacket.

Academic career (1993-2021)
From 1993 until his death, Simjanović was a professor of applied music at the Faculty of Applied Arts in Belgrade. From 1999 to 2002 he was giving lectures in the same field at the Belgrade Faculty of Music Arts and from 2000 to 2002 at the University of Montenegro Music Academy in Cetinje, Montenegro. He also lectured at Dunav Film School, Post-Secondary School of Electrical Engineering and Braća Karić Academy of Fine Arts.

In 1996, he published the book Primenjena muzika (Applied Music). He wrote articles for Leksikon filmskih i televizijskih pojmova (Lexicon of Film and TV terms). He collaborated in making of pedagogical music books for children with Lela Aleksić, Branka Cvejić and Zora Vasiljević.

Other activities
In 2004, Simjanović published an autobiographical book entitled  (How I Started (and Stopped) Being a Rocker).

Simjanović first symphony, The Symphony of New Ideas, had its premiere at Belgrade Fortress on 14 July 2006. It was the first Serbian symphony written in the 21st century.

During his career, Simjanović wrote music for over 500 television commercials.

Death
Simjanović died on 11 April 2021 in Belgrade, aged 74, due to complications caused by COVID-19 during the COVID-19 pandemic in Serbia.

Awards and honors
Golden Arena for Best Film Music for the Fragrance of Wild Flowers music score at the Pula Film Festival (1978)
Golden Arena for Best Film Music for the Balkan Express music score at the Pula Film Festival (1983)
Special Award of the City of Valencia (1983)
First Prize for Music for the When Father Was Away on Business music score at the Mladenovac Festival of Film Music, Costumes and Scenography.
First Prize for Music for Jat Airways promotional campaign at the Yugoslav Radio Television Festival of Audio and Video Clips in Budva (1988)
Award for the Tito and Me music score at the Herceg Novi Festival of Film Direction (1992)
Crystal Prism for the Tango Argentino music score at the Yugoslav Film Academy Award (1993)
First Prize for the Kazimir Malyevic’s Cross, Square and Circle music score at the Belgrade Festival of Short and Documentary Film (1993)
Annual Work Award at the Belgrade Festival of Short and Documentary Film (1994)
Best Music Score at the Čačak Festival of Animated Film (1995)
Award for the Belgrade Follies music score at the Belgrade Festival of Short and Documentary Film (1998)
Boro Tamindžić Award for the In the Name of the Father and the Son music score at the Mojkovac Film Festival (1999)
Best Music Score Award for the Cabaret Balkan music score at Sunčane Skale festival (2000)
Award of the City of Belgrade for Radio, Television and Film Making for The Cordon music score and Jedna tema jedan film / One Theme One Film album (2002)
Platinum Award for Best Music for the Loving Glances music score at Monte Carlo Film Festival (2003)
Shield of the Festival at the Belgrade Festival of Short and Documentary Film 50th anniversary (2003)
Award for the Loving Glances music score at the Herceg Novi Festival of Film Direction (2004)
FIPRESCI Best Music Award for The Tour music score (2009)
Lifka Award at the Palić Festival of European Film (2012)
Award for Lifetime Achievement and Contribution to Serbian Cinema by the Association of Film Artists of Serbia (2012)
FIPRESCI Best Music Award for the Falsifier music score (2013)
Award for Contribution to Film Art at the Novi Sad Cinema City Festival (2014).
The Golden Antenna at the Festival of Domestic TV Series (2014).
Golden Medal for Merits by the President of Serbia Tomislav Nikolić (2015)
The Golden Ring by the Cultural and Educational Association of Belgrade (2015)
Darko Kraljić Lifetime Achievement Award by the Association of Composers of Serbia (2018)

Discography

With Elipse

Extended plays
Sentimental Baby / Plaža (split EP with Perica Stojančić; 1965)
Pogledaj kroz prozor (1966)
Le Telelphone (1967)

Compilation albums
Elipse za prijatelje (1963-1968) (1999)

Solo

Studio albums
Beogradosti (with Milovan Vitezović; 1980)

Soundtrack albums
Originalna muzika iz filma Nacionalna klasa (1979)
Sok od šljiva – Muzika iz filma (1981)
Muzika iz filma Balkan ekspres (1983)
Papa Est En Voyage D' Affaires – Bande Original Du Film (1985)
Jagode u grlu – Muzika iz filma (1985)
Anđeo čuvar - Originalna muzika iz filma Gorana Paskaljevića (1987)
Balkan Express 2 – Muzika iz filma i TV serije (1989)
Bure baruta – Originalna muzika iz filma (1998)

Soundtrack EPs
Specijalno vaspitanje (1977)
Miris poljskog cveća – Originalna muzika iz filma (1978)

Singles
Finale Evrope (with Boris Bizetić; 1976)

Compilations
Jedna tema - jedan film (1982)
Balkan eskpres – Originalna muzika iz filmova (1999)Slike iz Sarajeva koje sam voleo (1999)Jedna tema jedan film / One Theme One Film (2002)Pesme iz filmova – Pop & rock 1 (2006)Pesme iz filmova – Pop & rock 2 (2006)Pesme iz filmova – Etno (2006)Pesme iz filmova – Jazz, obrade & aranžmani (2006)

Box setsMoje drage (2010)Radio i TV trezor Zorana Simjanovića (2015)

Filmography
CinemaSpecial Education (1977)Fragrance of Wild Flowers (1977)Boško Buha (1978)National Class Category Up to 785 ccm (1979)The Days on Earth Are Flowing (1979)Draga moja Iza (1979)Petria's Wreath (1980)All That Jack's (1980)Gazija (1981)Some Other Woman (1981)Sok od šljiva (1981)Do You Remember Dolly Bell? (1981)The Marathon Family (1982)Dvije polovine srca (1982)Variola Vera (1982)Something in Between (1983)Three Contributions to the Slovenian Madness (1983)Balkan Express (1983)Idi mi, dođi mi (1983)Opasni trag (1984)Moljac (1984)Maturanti (Pazi šta radiš) (1984)Šta se zgodi kad se ljubav rodi (1984)Šta je s tobom, Nina (1984)Žikina dinastija (1985)Taiwan Canasta (1985)I to će proći (1985)Hard to Swallow (1985)When Father Was Away on Business (1985)
 Hey Babu Riba (1986)The Beauty of Vice (1986)Reflections (1987)Uvek spremne žene (1987)Lager Niš (1987)Život radnika (1987)Guardian Angel (1987)A Film with No Name (1988)Journey to the South (1988)Cognac (1988)Drugi čovek (1988)Balkan Express 2 (1988)Time of Miracles (1989)Uroš blesavi (1989)Švedski aranžman (1989)Masmediologija na Balkanu (1989)The Meeting Point (1989)Balkanska perestrojka (1990)Stanica običnih vozova (1990)Virgina (1991)Tango Argentino (1992)Tito and Me (1992)Say Why Have You Left Me (1993)Terrace on the Roof (1995)The Tragic Burlesque (1995)Belgrade Follies (1997)Cabaret Balkan (1998)In the name of the Father and Son (1999)Serbia, Year Zero (2001)The Cordon (2002)Loving Glances (2003)Falling in the Paradise (2004)Midwinter Night's Dream (2004)Balkan Brothers (2005)The Tour (2008)Solemn Promise (2009)Falsifier (2013)Delirijum tremens (2019)

TV filmsLjubičice (1975)Sve što je bilo lepo (1976)Noć od paučine (1978)The Brides Are Coming (1978)Pucanj u šljiviku preko reke (1979)Mostarske kiše (1979)Buffet Titanic (1979)Boško Buha (1980)Samo za dvoje (1980)Ćorkan i Švabica (1980)Čeličenje Pavla Pletikose (1981)Četvrtak umesto petka (1982)Don Žuan se vraća iz rata (1982)Jelena Gavanski (1982)Malograđani (1983)Kaleidoskop dvadesetog veka (1984)Dvostruki udar (1985)Budite isti za 20 godina (1985)Griffon u Beogradu (1986)Apstinenti (1989)Hole in the Soul (1984)Prolece u Limasolu(1999)Harold i Mod (2001)Osma sednica ili Život je san (2007)Zlatno tele (2010)Equals (2014)A Stowaway on the Ship of Fools (2016)

TV seriesSlike bez rama – iz dečijih knjiga (1973)The Unpicked Strawberries (1975)Junaci (1976)Gledajući televiziju (1977)RTB Dnevnik (1979)Ne tako davno (1984)Jadranski otoci (1985)Thune (2008)Tajne vinove loze'' (2021)

References

External links
Zoran Simjanović at Discogs
Zoran Simjanović at Internet Movie Database

1946 births
2021 deaths
Serbian rock keyboardists
Serbian film score composers
Serbian musical theatre composers
Serbian television composers
Serbian classical composers
Yugoslav musicians
Yugoslav composers
Male film score composers
Male classical composers
Musicians from Belgrade
University of Arts in Belgrade alumni
Academic staff of the University of Arts in Belgrade
Golden Arena winners
International Animated Film Association
Deaths from the COVID-19 pandemic in Serbia